Shewanella livingstonensis is a species of bacteria. Its cells are psychrophilic, gram-negative, rod-shaped, facultatively anaerobic and motile by means of a single polar flagellum. Its type strain is LMG 19866T.

References

External links
Type strain of Shewanella livingstonensis at BacDive -  the Bacterial Diversity Metadatabase

Further reading
Stapleton Jr, R. D., and V. P. Singh, eds. Biotransformations: Bioremediation Technology for Health and Environmental Protection: Bioremediation Technology for Health and Environmental Protection. Vol. 36. Access Online via Elsevier, 2002.

External links
WORMS entry

Alteromonadales
Bacteria described in 2002